Gary L. Stewart (born July 24, 1961) is an American college basketball coach and the former head men's basketball coach at the University of California, Davis. In 2011, Stewart stepped down at UC Davis and became special projects administrator in the athletic department. Later that year, Stewart was named men's head coach at Stevenson University. He led the Mustangs in his second season to the playoffs for the first time in 7 years.

Stewart has also coached at Long Beach State, La Verne, California State University, East Bay, UC Santa Barbara, and Washington State. In 1997, he was named NCAC Co-Coach of the Year, and Bay Area Men's College Coach of the Year.

References

1961 births
Living people
American men's basketball coaches
American men's basketball players
Basketball coaches from California
Cal State East Bay Pioneers men's basketball coaches
College men's basketball head coaches in the United States
La Verne Leopards men's basketball coaches
La Verne Leopards men's basketball players
Long Beach State Beach men's basketball coaches
Sportspeople from Los Angeles
Stevenson Mustangs men's basketball coaches
UC Davis Aggies men's basketball coaches
UC Santa Barbara Gauchos men's basketball coaches
Washington State Cougars men's basketball coaches
Basketball players from Los Angeles